Georgios Bogris (alternate spelling: Giorgos , Greek: Γιώργος Μπόγρης; born 19 February 1989) is a Greek professional basketball player and the team captain for Apollon Patras of the Greek Basket League. He is 2.10 m (6 ft 10  in) tall, 109 kg (240 lbs.) in weight, and he plays at the center position.

Professional career
Bogris began his pro career in the Greek 2nd Division with Ilysiakos in 2006. In 2009, he signed a four-year deal with the 1st-tier level Greek Basket League club Panathinaikos. In August 2011, Bogris signed with Peristeri, but he was released from the team in November.

In the summer of 2012, Bogris signed with Panionios of the Greek Basket League. In September 2013, he signed with PAOK. In August 2014, Bogris signed with Liga ACB team Andorra.

In July 2015, he reached a two-year agreement with Spanish club Bilbao Basket. On 14 July 2016, Bogris signed with Spanish team Iberostar Tenerife. With the Canarians, he was named MVP of the sixth round of the 2016–17 Basketball Champions League.

On 30 July 2017, Bogris signed a three-year contract with Olympiacos. On 4 July 2019, Bogris was officially released from his contract with the Reds.

On 20 July 2019, he agreed to a three-year deal with Promitheas Patras. On 5 December 2019, Bogris and Promitheas parted ways in order for the player to transfer to Liga ACB and Basketball Champions League club Iberostar Tenerife, where he enjoyed much success in the past.

On August 15, 2021, Bogris signed with AEK Athens. He went on paid suspension in October of the same year, after a falling-out with head coach Stefanos Dedas. 

On February 9, 2022, Bogris signed with Apollon Patras for the rest of the season. In 10 games with Apollon, he averaged 4.6 points and 5.7 rebounds, playing around 24 minutes per contest. On August 11, 2022, he renewed his contract with the Patras club.

National team career

Greek junior national team
With Greece's junior national teams, Bogris played at the 2004 FIBA Europe Under-16 Championship and the 2005 FIBA Europe Under-16 Championship. He also played at the 2006 FIBA Europe Under-18 Championship. He won the silver medal at the 2007 FIBA Europe Under-18 Championship. He also played at the 2008 FIBA Europe Under-20 Championship, and he won the gold medal at the 2009 FIBA Europe Under-20 Championship.

Greek senior national team
Bogris has also been a member of the senior men's Greek national basketball team. He was selected to Greece's 12 man roster for the 2016 Turin FIBA World Olympic Qualifying Tournament. He also played at the EuroBasket 2017.

Personal life
Originally from Thespies, and raised in Thebes, Bogris has three younger sisters. He had a long-term personal relationship with the famous Greek singer Elli Kokkinou, from 2010 to 2017. Bogris has also dated briefly with the Greek-Cypriot singer Eleftheria Eleftheriou.

Awards and accomplishments

Pro career
2× Greek League Champion: (2010, 2011)
EuroLeague Champion: (2011)
2× Greek All-Star: (2014, 2019)
Greek League Most Improved Player: (2014)
FIBA Champions League Star Lineup Best Team: (2017)
FIBA Champions League Champion: (2017)

Greek junior national team
2007 FIBA Europe Under-18 Championship:  
2009 FIBA Europe Under-20 Championship:

References

External links
Twitter Account
Euroleague.net Profile
FIBA Profile
FIBA Europe Profile
Draftexpress.com Profile
Eurobasket.com Profile
Spanish League Profile 
Greek Basket League Profile 
Hellenic Federation Profile 

1989 births
Living people
AEK B.C. players
Apollon Patras B.C. players
Aris B.C. players
Basketball players at the 2015 European Games
BC Andorra players
Greek expatriate basketball people in Andorra
Bilbao Basket players
CB Canarias players
Centers (basketball)
European Games competitors for Greece
Greek expatriate basketball people in Spain
Greek Basket League players
Greek men's basketball players
Ilysiakos B.C. players
Liga ACB players
Olympiacos B.C. players
Panathinaikos B.C. players
Panionios B.C. players
P.A.O.K. BC players
Sportspeople from Thebes, Greece
Peristeri B.C. players
Promitheas Patras B.C. players